D-Xylulose 5-phosphate (D-xylulose-5-P) is an intermediate in the pentose phosphate pathway. It is a ketose sugar formed from ribulose-5-phosphate. Although previously thought of mainly as an intermediary in the pentose phosphate pathway, recent research reported that the sugar has a role in gene expression, mainly by promoting the ChREBP transcription factor in the well-fed state. However, more recent study showed that D-glucose-6-phosphate, rather than D-xylulose-5-phosphate, is essential for the activation of ChREBP in response to glucose.

References

Monosaccharide derivatives
Organophosphates